() (English: The Taming of the Shrew) is a German-language comic opera in four acts by the German composer Hermann Goetz. It was written between 1868 and 1872 and first performed at the National Theatre Mannheim on 11 October 1874 under the conductor . The style of the opera shows Goetz turning away from the musical ideas of Richard Wagner towards the classicism of Mozart.  was a huge success, not only in Germany but in the United States and in Great Britain, where it received high praise from George Bernard Shaw.

Roles

Recordings
 1944: Sächsische Staatsoper Dresden chorus and orchestra, conducted by Karl Elmendorff (Urania)
 2007: Bayerischer Rundfunk chorus and orchestra, conducted by Joseph Keilberth (Profil)

References

German-language operas
Operas by Hermann Goetz
1874 operas
Operas
Operas based on The Taming of the Shrew